Our Nation may refer to:

Our Nation (1983), political party founded by Martin Webster, former member of the National Front in the UK
Our Nation (2018), political party founded by Henry Bolton, former leader of the UK Independence Party
Our Nation (Dada Life album), 2018 album

See also
One Nation (disambiguation)